Callum Tyler Whelan (born 24 September 1998) is an English professional footballer who plays as a midfielder for  club Gateshead, on loan from  club Solihull Moors.

A graduate of the academy at Manchester United, he had a loan spell at Port Vale in the 2018–19 season, but did not feature in a matchday squad. He signed with Watford in August 2019 and featured in two FA Cup games during the 2019–20 season. He signed with Oldham Athletic in August 2020. After his release by Oldham, he signed for Solihull Moors in July 2022, from where he joined Gateshead on loan in February 2023.

Career

Manchester United
Whelan grew up in the Barnsley village of Hemingfield, and spent the early part of his childhood at the Barnsley Academy. He joined Manchester United at the age of eight, and went on to become one of three players shortlisted for the Jimmy Murphy Young Player of the Year award in 2017. He signed a new contract with the "Red Devils" in July 2018. On 31 January 2019, he joined League Two side Port Vale on loan until the end of the 2018–19 season. He failed to make it into a match-day squad under new manager John Askey, who felt he was not yet ready for senior football, and the loan was ended early on 2 April.

Watford
In August 2019, Whelan signed a one-year contract at Watford, with the option of a further year. He made his first-team debut for the "Hornets" in the fourth round of the FA Cup on 4 January 2020, coming on as a 61st-minute substitute for Domingos Quina in a 3–3 draw with Tranmere Rovers at Vicarage Road. He started in the replay 19 days later, which ended in a 2–1 defeat. However the club confirmed he would not be offered a new contract on 6 August 2020.

Oldham Athletic
On 28 August 2020, Whelan signed a two-year contract at Oldham Athletic after impressing head coach Harry Kewell during a three-week trial period. His game time and form improved after Keith Curle replaced Kewell in March. He started 23 league games in the 2020–21 campaign, making a total of 38 competitive appearances. He scored his first career goal on 29 March 2022, in a 2–0 win over Leyton Orient at Boundary Park. Whelan was released by manager John Sheridan following relegation at the end of the 2021–22 season.

Solihull Moors
On 26 July 2022, Whelan signed a one-year contract with National League club Solihull Moors after a trial period, during which he scored a goal in a friendly against Brackley Town. He played 20 matches for the club, but lost his first-team place due to injury and increased competition in the midfield, so in February 2023 he moved on loan to league rivals Gateshead until the end of the 2022–23 season.

Style of play
Whelan is a central midfielder with good short-range passing skills.

Career statistics

References

1998 births
Living people
Footballers from Barnsley
English footballers
Association football midfielders
Barnsley F.C. players
Manchester United F.C. players
Port Vale F.C. players
Watford F.C. players
Oldham Athletic A.F.C. players
Solihull Moors F.C. players
Gateshead F.C. players
English Football League players
National League (English football) players